Tin Sontsia (sometimes literal translation Sun Shadow is used) is a Ukrainian folk metal band from Kyiv, although their music contains elements of symphonic metal, as well. Primarily the band's style was close to alternative rock, but in 2003 they have come to a so-called "Cossack rock". Almost all of the lyrics are in Ukrainian except couple of Belarusian songs. The band has taken part in number of festivals the biggest of which are Basovišča and Zakhid. They are known to tour extensively and to support Ukrainian soldiers fighting at the ATO zone. Their song "Kozaky" was the unofficial hymn of the Ukraine national football team during the UEFA Euro 2016 cup. The same song serves as the intro for professional boxer Oleksandr Usyk.

Members 

Current members
 Serhiy Vasyliuk (lead vocal, acoustic guitar)
 Ivan Luzan (bandura)
 Mykola Luzan (guitar, singing)
 Volodymyr Khavruk (drums)
 Ruslan Mikaelyan (guitar)
 Ivan Hryhoriak (bass)

Discography 
Albums
  2002 - Святість Віри (Holiness the Faith, Sviatist Viry, Demo)
  2005 - За Межею (Beyond the Bound, Za Mezheiu, Demo)
  2005 - Над Диким Полем (Above the Wild Field, Nad Dykym Polem)
  2007 - Полум'яна Рута (Flaming Rue, Polumiana Ruta)
  2011 - Танець Серця (Dance of the Heart, Tanets Sertsia)
  2014 - Грім В Ковальні Бога (Thunder In The Blacksmith Of God, Hrim V Kovalni Boha)
  2016 - Буремний Край (Rebellious Land, Buremnyi Krai)
  2018 - Зачарований Світ (Enchanted World, Zacharovanyi Svit)
  2020 - На Небесних Конях (On Heveanly Horses, Na Nebesnykh Koniakh)

Side and solo projects
  2005 - Зачарований Світ (Enchanted World, Zacharovanyi Svit)
  2010 - Сховане обличчя (Hidden Face, Skhovane Oblychchia)

References

External links 

 
 
 Last.fm
 
 Interview with Serhiy Vasylyuk on "Radio Liberty Ukraine" 
 Interview with Serhiy Vasylyuk in "Ukrayina Moloda" 

Ukrainian folk metal musical groups
Musical groups established in 1999
1999 establishments in Ukraine
Musical groups from Kyiv